Hungary competed at the 1964 Summer Olympics in Tokyo, Japan. 182 competitors, 150 men and 32 women, took part in 111 events in 17 sports.

Medalists

Gold
 Árpád Bárány, Tamás Gábor, István Kausz, Győző Kulcsár, and Zoltán Nemere — Fencing, Men's Épée Team Competition
 Tibor Pézsa — Fencing, Men's Sabre Individual
 Ildikó Rejtő — Fencing, Women's Foil Individual 
 Paula Marosi, Katalin Juhász, Judit Ágoston, Lídia Dömölky, and Ildikó Rejtő — Fencing, Women's Foil Team Competition
 Ferenc Török — Modern Pentathlon, Men's Individual Competition
 László Hammerl — Shooting, Men's Small-bore Rifle, prone 
 Imre Polyák — Wrestling, Men's Greco-Roman Featherweight 
 István Kozma — Wrestling, Men's Greco-Roman Heavyweight 
 Ferenc Bene, Tibor Csernai, János Farkas, József Gelei, Kálmán Ihász, Sándor Katona, Imre Komora, Ferenc Nógrádi, Dezső Novák, Árpád Orbán, Károly Palotai, Antal Szentmihályi, Gusztáv Szepesi, and Zoltán Varga — Football (soccer), Men's Team Competition
 Miklós Ambrus, András Bodnár, Ottó Boros, Zoltán Dömötör, László Felkai, Dezső Gyarmati, Tivadar Kanizsa, György Kárpáti, János Konrád, Mihály Mayer, Dénes Pócsik, and Péter Rusorán — Water Polo, Men's Team Competition

Silver
 Gyula Zsivótzky — Athletics, Men's Hammer Throw 
 Gergely Kulcsár — Athletics, Men's Javelin Throw
 Márta Rudas — Athletics, Women's Javelin Throw 
 Mihály Hesz — Canoeing, Men's K1 1000m Kayak Singles 
 Katalin Makray — Gymnastics, Women's Uneven Bars 
 Imre Földi — Weightlifting, Men's Bantamweight 
 Géza Tóth — Weightlifting, Men's Light Heavyweight

Bronze
 Vilmos Varju — Athletics, Men's Shot Put 
 Anikó Ducza — Gymnastics, Women's Floor Exercises 
 Imre Nagy, Ferenc Török and Ottó Török — Modern Pentathlon, Men's Team Competition
 László Hammerl — Shooting, Men's Small-bore Rifle, Three Positions 
 Győző Veres — Weightlifting, Men's Light Heavyweight

Athletics

Basketball

Boxing

Canoeing

Cycling

Seven cyclists represented Hungary in 1964.

Individual road race
 János Juszkó
 András Mészáros
 Antal Megyerdi
 László Mahó

Team time trial
 János Juszkó
 András Mészáros
 László Mahó
 Ferenc Stámusz

Sprint
 Richárd Bicskey
 Ferenc Habony

1000m time trial
 Ferenc Habony

Tandem
 Richárd Bicskey
 Ferenc Habony

Diving

Fencing

20 fencers, 15 men and 5 women, represented Hungary in 1964. Hungarian fencers topped the medal table for the event, with four gold.

Men's foil
 Jenő Kamuti
 Sándor Szabó
 József Gyuricza

Men's team foil
 Jenő Kamuti, László Kamuti, József Gyuricza, Sándor Szabó, Béla Gyarmati

Men's épée
 Zoltán Nemere
 Győző Kulcsár
 István Kausz

Men's team épée
 Győző Kulcsár, Zoltán Nemere, Tamás Gábor, István Kausz, Árpád Bárány

Men's sabre
 Tibor Pézsa
 Attila Kovács
 Péter Bakonyi

Men's team sabre
 Péter Bakonyi, Miklós Meszéna, Attila Kovács, Zoltán Horváth, Tibor Pézsa

Women's foil
 Ildikó Ságiné Ujlakyné Rejtő
 Katalin Nagyné Juhász
 Lídia Sákovicsné Dömölky

Women's team foil
 Ildikó Ságiné Ujlakyné Rejtő, Lídia Sákovicsné Dömölky, Katalin Nagyné Juhász, Judit Ágoston-Mendelényi, Paula Marosi

Football

Gymnastics

Modern pentathlon

Three male pentathletes represented Hungary in 1964. Ferenc Török won an individual gold and the team won bronze.

Individual
 Ferenc Török
 Imre Nagy
 Ottó Török

Team
 Ferenc Török
 Imre Nagy
 Ottó Török

Sailing

Shooting

Eight shooters represented Hungary in 1964. László Hammerl won gold in the 50 m rifle, prone and László Hammerl won bronze in the 50 m rifle, three positions.

25 m pistol
 Szilárd Kun
 Gábor Balla

50 m pistol
 Lajos Kelemen
 Ferenc Gönczi

300 m rifle, three positions
 Zoltán Sándor
 Imre Simkó

50 m rifle, three positions
 László Hammerl
 Tibor Jakosits

50 m rifle, prone
 László Hammerl
 Tibor Jakosits

Swimming

Volleyball

Men's Team Competition
 Round Robin
 Lost to Czechoslovakia (3-2)
 Defeated Japan (3-0)
 Defeated United States (3-0)
 Lost to Soviet Union (0-3)
 Lost to Brazil (2-3)
 Lost to Romania (1-3)
 Defeated Netherlands (3-1)
 Defeated South Korea (3-2)
 Lost to Bulgaria (1-3) → Sixth place
Team Roster
 Bela Czafik 
 Vilmos Ivancso 
 Csabas Lantos
 Gabor Bodo 
 István Molnar 
 Otto Prouza 
 Ferenc Tuske 
 Tibor Florián 
 Laszlo Galos 
 Antal Kangyerka 
 Mihaly Tatar 
 Ferenc Janosi

Water polo

Weightlifting

Wrestling

References

Nations at the 1964 Summer Olympics
1964
1964 in Hungarian sport